Alexander Grigoriyevich Stroganov (31 December 1795 – 14 August 1891) was Russia's minister of the interior from 1839 to 1841 and then a member of the State Council from 1849.

He also served as the Governor General of Novorossiia and Bessarabia from 1855 to 1863.

He was a member of the Stroganov family.

See also
List of Russian commanders in the Patriotic War of 1812
Sergei Grigoriyevich Stroganov

Notes

External links
 Novorossiia leaders and Odessa Ukraine mayors

Politicians of the Russian Empire
Alexander Grigoriyevich
Members of the State Council (Russian Empire)
Government officials of Congress Poland
Russian people of the November Uprising
1795 births
1891 deaths
Governors-General of Novorossiya
Governors-General of Little Russia